Aleš Chvalovský (born 29 May 1979) is a Czech former professional football goalkeeper who played more than 150 matches in the Czech First League.

Career 
Aleš Chvalovský played in his youth for Chmel Blšany, Dukla Prague, SK Rakovník, Slavia Prague, Liverpool F.C., Marine F.C. and again for Chmel Blšany. He made his Czech First League debut in the 1998–99 season for Chmel Blšany. After the 1999–2000 season, he was signed by German side VfB Stuttgart but played only for the B team. After only half a year Chvalovský returned in January 2001 to Blšany, where he again became the first-choice goalkeeper.

In 2005, Chvalovský was signed by the Cypriot club Apollon Limassol. During his first year in Cyprus he had a great season; his team won the championship unbeaten in Cyprus and he was voted player of the year in Cyprus for the 2005–06 season.

Personal life 
Chvalovský is the son of the president of many years of the Football Association of the Czech Republic František Chvalovský, who likewise played as a goalkeeper in Blšany.

Honours 
Chvalovský in 2000 became European runner-up with the Czech Republic U-21 national football team in Slovakia and also played at the 2000 Olympic Games in Sydney. He was part of the Czech U-21 squad which won the 2002 UEFA European Under-21 Championship, although he was reserve goalkeeper in the tournament.

References

External links 
 
 

Living people
1979 births
Association football goalkeepers
Czech footballers
Czech Republic under-21 international footballers
Czech expatriate footballers
Footballers at the 2000 Summer Olympics
Olympic footballers of the Czech Republic
Czech First League players
Cypriot First Division players
FK Chmel Blšany players
Apollon Limassol FC players
VfB Stuttgart players
VfB Stuttgart II players
Expatriate footballers in Germany
Expatriate footballers in Cyprus
Czech expatriate sportspeople in Germany
Czech expatriate sportspeople in Cyprus